"Love Is Life" is a song and single performed by British group, Hot Chocolate with accompaniment by the Trinidad Singers and written by band members, Errol Brown and Tony Wilson. Produced by Mickie Most, it was released in 1970 and reached 6, on the UK charts, staying for twelve weeks and was their first single to make the UK Charts.

References

1970 songs
Songs written by Errol Brown
Hot Chocolate (band) songs
RAK Records singles
Song recordings produced by Mickie Most
Songs written by Tony Wilson (musician)